Berta Piñán Suárez (Caño, Cangas de Onís, Spain, March 26, 1963) is an Asturian writer, professor of Spanish Language and Literature, full member of the Academy of the Asturian Language, and since July 25, 2019, Minister of  (Culture, Linguistic Policy and Tourism of the Principality of Asturias).

Education
She studied at the Instituto de Cangas de Onís, where she returned as a teacher years later.

Career

In 1985, she won the Poetry Prize of the Academy of the Asturian Language withherhis work , which was published in 1986. His poetic work also includes  with which she won the Asturian poetry prize,  (1991). This was followed by the publication of Temporada de pesca (Trabe, 1998), Un mes (Trabe, 2003), and Noches de incendio (1985-2002) (Trea, 2005), with a bilingual selection of her poems. In 2008, the Valencian publishing house Denes presented the anthology in Catalan Un mes i altres poemes (translated by Jaume Subirana i Ortín). In 2010. Piñán published her collection of poems La mancadura / El daño (2010). She has translated into Asturian works by John Christopher (Les montañes blanques) and Giusseppe Ungaretti (Ventidós poemes), and has written several essays such as Notes de sociollingüística asturiana (Llibros del Pexe, 1991) or Alfaya (1989).

Committed to feminism, Piñán published in 2003 Tres sieglos construyendo la igualdá, ¿Qué ye'l feminismu?

In 2004, at the 2004 Princess of Asturias Awards closing ceremony, the then Prince Felipe, read some verses from the poem "Una casa" from Piñán's book Un mes (2003) to highlight the work carried out for 20 years by the organization's Foundation and to underline the role that in the future, his wife, Letizia Ortiz, would play "in the care of that tree".—

From 2005 to 2011, Piñán was a member of the jury of the Prince of Asturias Award for Letters.

In 2005, Piñán published La maleta al agua, a collection of short stories and two poems whose thematic nexus is the reality of emigration. Her narrative work also includes children's literature, Lula, Lulina en Trabe (1996) his first work, or Arroz, agua y maíz Pintar-Pintar (2009) a social poetry book for children in which she tells in 20 poems 20 stories of children from different countries, winner of the "María Josefa Canellada Award" for Children's and Young People's Literature in Asturian in 2008. In 2008 and 2009, she received the "Asturias Critics' Prize" awarded by the Asturias Writers' Association, in the category of Children's and Young People's Literature in Asturian with Les coses que-y prestten a Fran (2008) and L'estranxeru (2009) and in 2012, the "Critics' Prize of Asturian Letters" with La mio hermana ye una mofeta.

On May 9, 2008, she became a full member of the Academia de la Llingua Asturiana.

Their work is linked to the poetic Asturian literary tradition.

Since July 25, 2019, Piñán has served as Minister of Culture, Linguistic Policy and Tourism of the Principality of Asturias in the government of the Asturian socialist Adrián Barbón.

Awards and honours
 1985 Academy of the Asturian Language Poetry Award for Al abellu les besties
 1991 Teodoro Cuesta Poetry Award for Vida Privada
 1995 Trabe Narrative Prize for La tierra entero
 2008 María Josefa Canellada Award for Children's and Young People's Literature for Agua, arroz y maíz
 2008 and 2009 Critics' Prize of Asturias in the category of Children's and Young Adult Literature in Asturian for Les coses que-y presten a Fran (2008) and L'estranxeru (2009)
 2009 Diploma in the Visual AWarads for Editorial Design for Agua, arroz y maíz
 2012 Asturian Letters Critic Award from the Junta por la Defensa de la Lengua for La mio hermana ye una mofeta

Selected works

Poetry
 1986 Al abellu les besties (Academia de la Llingua Asturiana)
 1991 Vida privada
 1998 Temporada de pesca (Ed. Trabe)
 2002 Un mes (Ed. Trabe)
 2005 Noches de incendio (1985-2002) (Ediciones Trea).
 2008 Un mes i altres poemes (Denes. Edicions de la Guerra)
 2010 La mancadura / El daño (Ediciones Trea)

Prose
 1995 Muyeres que cuenten, anthology of fiction written by women with María Teresa González, Carme Martínez, Esther Prieto, Lourdes Álvarez, Consuelo Vega, Berta Piñán and Maite G. Iglesias (Ed. Trabe)
 1996 La tierra entero
 2003 Antoloxía del cuentu triste with Xuan Bello and Roberto González-Quevedo (Publicaciones Ambitu)
 2005 La maleta al agua (Ed. Publicaciones Ámbitu)
 2007 En casa ayena (Ed. Ateneo Obrero de Gijón)
 2008 Textos literarios y contextos escolares with Agustín Fernández Paz, Juan Mata, Guadalupe Jover, Gustavo Bombini, Víctor Moreno, Manuel Rivas, Gonzalo Moure (Atxa. Ed. Grao)

Children and young adults
 1996 Luna lunila (illustrations by Carmen Peña)
 2005 El branu de Mirtya (Ed.Publicaciones Ámbitu )
 2007 Las cosas que le gustan a Fran (Hotel Papel Ediciones)
 2007 El extranjero (Hotel Papel Ediciones)
 2009 Agua, arroz y maíz (illustrations by Elena Fernández) (Editorial Pintar)
 2011 Mi hermana es una mofeta (illustrations by Francesca Assirelli) (Ed. Pintar)

Non-fiction
 1991 Notes de Sociollingüistica Asturiana (Ed. Llibros del Pexes) 
 1989 Alfaya with Xuan Bello (Material Didáctico) 
 2003 Tres sieglos construyendo la igualdá

See also
 Government of Adrián Barbón

References

1963 births
Living people
People from Cangas de Onís
Asturian-language writers
Spanish academics
21st-century Spanish poets
Spanish feminist writers
Spanish children's writers
Spanish women children's writers